Munir Uz Zaman is a Bangladeshi photographer.

Life and work
Currently, Munir Uz Zaman works for the Paris-based international news agency Agency France-Press (AFP). He studied photography at the Pathshala South Asian Media Institute, Bangladesh. His has received awards and recognition for his works documenting the Rohingya refugee crisis. He has also published photos depicting daily life in Bangladesh.

Awards
 Asian media awards ceremony
 Spot News – First place, Fccthai
 Category - Photo Feature. Awarded Special Merit Diploma,
Subject – Bangladesh Factory Collapse.
Atlanta Photojournalism Seminar,
Year 2013, Spot News, Second Prize.
 Subject - Rana Plaza Garments Building Collapse.
 Photo week Washington DC, Year 2013,
 Photojournalism Single image. First Prize.
Subject - Rana Plaza Garments Building Collapse.
Foreign Correspondent Club of Hong Kong and Amnesty International, Human Rights Press Award 2012.
 Category - Photo Feature. First Prize.
 Subject – Rohingya Refugee.
Foreign Correspondent Club of Thailand. Year - 2012. First Prize Spot News.
 Subject - Rohingya Refugee 
 POY Picture of the year. Title: Rescue. Honorary Mention, Year - 2009

References

Living people
Bangladeshi photojournalists
Bangladeshi photographers
Bangladeshi artists
Bangladeshi male writers
Year of birth missing (living people)